Martin Eugene Mull (born August 18, 1943) is an American actor, comedian and musician who has appeared in many television and film roles. He is also a painter and recording artist. As an actor, he first became known in his role on Mary Hartman, Mary Hartman and its spin-off Fernwood 2 Night. Among his other notable roles are Colonel Mustard in the 1985 film Clue, Leon Carp on Roseanne, Willard Kraft on Sabrina, the Teenage Witch, Vlad Masters/Plasmius on Danny Phantom, and Gene Parmesan on Arrested Development. He had a recurring role on Two and a Half Men as Russell, the drug-using, humorous pharmacist.

Early years and education
Mull was born in Chicago, the son of Betty Mull, an actress and director, and Harold Mull, a carpenter. He moved with his family to North Ridgeville, Ohio, when he was two years old. They lived there until he was 15 years old, when his family moved to New Canaan, Connecticut. There he attended and graduated from New Canaan High School. He studied painting and graduated in 1965 from the Rhode Island School of Design with a Bachelor of Fine Arts; in 1967, he earned a Master of Fine Arts in painting, also from RISD.

Career

Musical career
Mull broke into show business as a songwriter, penning Jane Morgan's 1970 country single, "A Girl Named Johnny Cash", which peaked at No. 61 on Billboards country charts. Shortly thereafter, he began his own recording career.

Throughout the 1970s, and especially in the first half of the decade, Mull was best known as a musical comedian, performing satirical and humorous songs both live and in studio recordings. Rather than the stage trappings of most musical acts, Mull would decorate his stage with comfortable thrift store furniture.  Notable live gigs included opening for Randy Newman and Sandy Denny at Boston Symphony Hall in 1973; Frank Zappa at Austin's Armadillo World Headquarters in 1973; Billy Joel in Wilkes-Barre, Pennsylvania in 1974; and for Bruce Springsteen at the Shady Grove Music Fair in Gaithersburg, Maryland, in October 1974. His self-titled debut album, released by Capricorn in 1972, featured many noteworthy musicians, including Ramblin' Jack Elliott, Levon Helm from The Band, Keith Spring of NRBQ and Libby Titus.

Elvis Costello and Gary Sperrazza attribute the remark "Writing about music is like dancing about architecture" to Martin Mull.

Acting career
Mull's first well-known acting role was as Garth Gimble in the 1976 television nighttime absurdist soap opera Mary Hartman, Mary Hartman. This led to work in the spin-off  talk show parodies Fernwood 2 Night (1977) and America 2 Night (1978), in which he played talk show host Barth Gimble (Garth Gimble's twin brother), opposite Fred Willard, as sidekick and announcer Jerry Hubbard. Mull also appeared as the neurotic disc jockey Eric Swan in the 1978 movie FM, his feature film debut.

In 1979, Mull appeared in the Taxi episode Hollywood Calling. He created, wrote for and starred in the short-lived 1984 CBS sitcom Domestic Life, with Megan Follows playing his teenaged daughter. In one episode of The Golden Girls, he played a hippie who was afraid of the outside world. He had a long-running role as Leon Carp, Roseanne Conner's gay boss (and later business partner) on the TV series Roseanne.

During the 1980s, Mull played supporting roles in the films Mr. Mom and Clue, and had a rare lead role in Serial. He also starred in a series of commercials for Michelob and Pizza Hut, and in a series of television and radio commercials for Red Roof Inn with Fred Willard. He appeared in the Pecos Bill episode of the Shelley Duvall TV series Tall Tales & Legends. He also did the voice of Vlad Masters/Vlad Plasmius, the main villain in Danny Phantom.
From 1996-2001, Mull played Willard Kraft on the show Sabrina the Teenage Witch as her principal. 
Mull has appeared as a guest star on the game show Hollywood Squares, appearing as the center square in the show's final season, from 2003 to 2004. In late 2004 and in 2013's Netflix-produced Season 4, he portrayed Gene Parmesan, a private investigator, on the TV series Arrested Development. During 2008 and 2009, Mull guest starred in two episodes of the television series Gary Unmarried, as Allison's father.

Mull also starred in the Fox sitcoms Dads and The Cool Kids, the latter with David Alan Grier, Vicki Lawrence, and Leslie Jordan.

Artistic career
Mull has been a painter since the 1970s, and his work has appeared in group and solo exhibits. He participated in the June 15, 1971 exhibit "Flush with the Walls" in the men's room of the Boston Museum of Fine Arts to protest the lack of contemporary and local art in the museum. His work often combines photorealist painting, and the pop art and collage styles. He published a book of some of his paintings, titled Paintings Drawings and Words, in 1995. One of his paintings was used on the cover for the 2008 Joyce Carol Oates novel My Sister, My Love. Another painting, titled After Dinner Drinks (2008), which is owned by Steve Martin, was used for the cover of Love Has Come for You, an album by Steve Martin and Edie Brickell.

Personal life
Twice divorced, Mull is married to singer Wendy Haas. They have a daughter, Maggie, who as of 2021 is a co-executive producer for Family Guy.

In a 2010 interview on The Green Room with Paul Provenza, Mull identified himself as an agnostic, saying "I certainly don't begrudge someone else their choice to follow whatever they do, it's just for me, it doesn't make a lot of sense. I think more harm has come to this planet through organized religion, probably, than any single situation that we've invented."

Filmography

Films
{| class="wikitable sortable"
|-
! Year
! Film
! Role
! class="unsortable" | Notes
|-
|1978 || FM || Eric Swan ||
|-
|1980 || Serial || Harvey Holroyd ||
|-
|1980 || My Bodyguard || Mr. Peache ||
|-
|1981 || Take This Job and Shove It || Dick Ebersol ||
|-
|1982 || Flicks|| Tang/Arthur Lyle|| aka "Loose Joints"
|-
|1983 || Mr. Mom || Ron Richardson ||
|-
|1983 || Private School || Pharmacy Guy || Uncredited
|-
|1984 || Bad Manners || Warren Fitzpatrick || aka Growing Pains|-
|1985
|Television Parts|Himself
|
|-
|1985 || California Girls || Elliot ||
|-
|1985 || Clue || Colonel Mustard ||
|-
|1985 || O.C. and Stiggs || Pat Coletti ||
|-
|1986 ||data-sort-value="Boss' Wife, The"| The Boss' Wife || Tony Dugdale  ||
|-
|1988 || Rented Lips || Archie Powell ||
|-
|1988 || Portrait of a White Marriage ||Himself (as talk show host)||
|-
|1989 || Cutting Class || William Carson III ||
|-
|1990 || Ski Patrol || Sam Marris ||
|-
|1990 || Far Out Man || Dr. Leddledick ||
|-
|1992 || Miracle Beach || Donald Burbank ||
|-
|1992 || Dance with Death || Art ||
|-
|1993 || Mrs. Doubtfire || Justin Gregory ||
|-
|1994 || How the West Was Fun || Bart Gifooley ||
|-
|1994 || Mr. Write || Dan Barnes ||
|- 
|1996 || Edie & Pen || Johnnie Sparkle ||
|-
|1996 || Jingle All the Way || D.J. ||
|-
|1996 || 101 Dalmatians || Wildlife Presenter||
|-
|1997 || Beverly Hills Family Robinson || Doug Robinson ||
|-
|1998 || Zack and Reba || Virgil Payne ||
|-
|1998 || Richie Rich's Christmas Wish || Richard Rich Sr. ||
|-
|2000 || Attention Shoppers || Charles ||
|-
|2002 || The Year That Trembled || Wayne Simonelli ||
|-
|2004 || A Boyfriend for Christmas || Martin Grant ||
|-
|2006 || Relative Strangers || Jeffry Morton ||
|-
|2010 || Killers || Holbrook ||
|-
|2011 || Oliver's Ghost || Clive Rutledge ||
|-
|2013 || Tim's Vermeer || Himself ||
|-
|2018 || A Futile and Stupid Gesture || Modern Doug Kenney ||
|}

Television

Video games

DiscographyMartin Mull (1972)
"Dueling Tubas" (Single) charted at #92 on Billboards Hot 100 (1973); #87 in Canada; #70 in Canada ACMartin Mull and His Fabulous Furniture in Your Living Room! (1973)Normal (1974)In the Soop with Martin Mull (also with: Ed Wise and Les Daniels) (1974)Days of Wine and Neuroses (1975)I'm Everyone I've Ever Loved (1977)No Hits, Four Errors – The Best of Martin Mull (1977)Sex & Violins (1978)Near Perfect/Perfect (1979)Mulling It Over – A Musical Ouvre-View of Martin Mull'' (1998)

References

External links

Martin Mull on Artnet
 

1943 births
20th-century American comedians
20th-century American male actors
20th-century American musicians
20th-century American painters
21st-century American male actors
21st-century American musicians
21st-century American painters
21st-century American comedians
American agnostics
American comedy musicians
American male comedians
American male film actors
American male television actors
American male video game actors
American male voice actors
American male painters
Comedians from Illinois
Comedians from Ohio
Living people
Male actors from Chicago
People from New Canaan, Connecticut
People from North Ridgeville, Ohio
Rhode Island School of Design alumni
20th-century American male artists
Rhode Island School of Design alumni in music